Claudio Guarino (Cesa, Italy, January 1966–London, United Kingdom, February 2004) was a multimedia visual artist and musician. He worked with video, performance, film and photography. His works were operatic performances in gallery spaces emphasising on visual rather than musical aspects.

Guarino studied at Goldsmiths College and the Royal College of Art in London. At Goldsmiths, he was awarded the Hamad Butt Award in 1997. In 1998 he was selected for the 'New Contemporaries' exhibition curated by Sacha Craddock.

Solo shows 
 Lost: The Unmovable Desire, Palazzo Ducale, Genoa, 2002.
 The Kiss of Tosca, performance opera at Galleria Artra, Milan, 2000.
 Aria, performance opera at Galleria Artra, Milan, 1998.
 Viene, performance opera at Chiesa di Sant'Angelo, Pisa, 1998.
 House of Injection, performance opera at Institute of Contemporary Arts, London, 1997. Music composed by Hayden Parsey.
 Mater Dolorosa, performance opera at Victoria Miro Gallery, London, 1997. Music composed by Hayden Parsey.
 Suspicion, performance opera at Victoria Miro Gallery, London, 1996. Music composed by Hayden Parsey.

Group shows 
 Limit: Video Invitational, fa projects, London, 2003
 Meant Me, Royal College of Art, London, 2002
 Sledge, The Jam Factory, London, 2002
 I giochi e le fiabe, Museo Laboratorio d'Arte Contemporanea, Citta Sant'Angelo, Italy, 2000
 Eurostar, Westland Palace, London, 2000
 Soggettivita e narrazione, Museo d'Arte Contemporanea, Caste of Rivoli, Turin, 1999
 New Contemporaries, Tea Factory, Liverpool, 1998
 Corto Circuito, Palazzo Reale, Naples, 1998

Bibliography 
 Steve Child, Giorgio Verzotti and Francesco Bernadelli (2008) Claudio Guarino, Charta Art Books, Milan  
 Maria Rosa Sossai (2002), Artevideo: Storie e culture del video d'artista in Italia, Silvana Editoriale, Milan 
 Giorgio Verzotti, "Claudio Guarino: The Kiss of Tosca", Artforum, November 2000 
 Sacha Craddock, Phyllida Barlow, Eddie Berg, Adrian Searle and Christine Hohenbuchler (1998), New Contemporaries, New Contemporaries, London

External links 
 Claudio Guarino website , Archived version

References 

Italian performance artists
Italian contemporary artists
1966 births
2004 deaths
Alumni of Goldsmiths, University of London